Health (also known unofficially as You Will Love Each Other) is the debut album by American noise rock band Health.  The album was recorded at the Los Angeles club The Smell.

In 2014, NME listed the album as one of the "101 Albums to Hear Before You Die," where it ranked 68th.

Track listing
"Heaven" - 2:37
"Girl Attorney" - 0:36
"Triceratops" - 3:14
"Crimewave" - 2:04
"Courtship" - 0:56
"Zoothorns" - 2:48
"Tabloid Sores" - 2:50
"/ / M \ \" - 3:26
"Glitter Pills" - 3:38
"Perfect Skin" - 4:21
"Lost Time" - 2:12

References

2007 debut albums
Health (band) albums
Lovepump United albums